Jafa Kandeh (also Romanized as Jafā Kandeh) is a village in Banafsh Tappeh Rural District, Now Kandeh District, Bandar-e Gaz County, Golestan Province, Iran. At the 2006 census, its population was 1,099, in 292 families.

References 

Populated places in Bandar-e Gaz County